Abū Muḥammad Qāsim ibn Abī Hāshim Muḥammad al-Ḥasanī al-‘Alawī (d. 1123/1124) was the second Emir of Mecca from the sharifian dynasty of the Hawashim. He succeeded his father Abu Hashim after the latter's death in 487 AH AH (1094). He died in 1123 or 1124, as Ibn Fahd writes:

He was succeeded by his son Fulaytah.

Sources 

12th-century Arabs
Sharifs of Mecca